Ear for Eye (stylized as ear for eye) is a British drama film, written and directed by debbie tucker green, based upon her play of the same name. It stars Lashana Lynch, Tosin Cole, Carmen Munroe, Danny Sapani, Nadine Marshall, Arinzé Kene and Jade Anouka.

The film had its world premiere at the BFI London Film Festival on 16 October 2021, and aired on the BBC on the same day.

Cast
 Lashana Lynch
 Tosin Cole
 Carmen Munroe
 Danny Sapani
 Nadine Marshall
 Arinzé Kene
 Jade Anouka

Production
In December 2020, it was announced Lashana Lynch, Tosin Cole, Carmen Munroe, Danny Sapani, Nadine Marshall, Arinzé Kene and Jade Anouka had joined the cast of the film, with debbie tucker green directing from a screenplay she wrote. Barbara Broccoli would serve as an executive producer under her Eon Productions banner.

Principal photography took place at Kennington Film Studios in London, and concluded by December 2020.

Release
The film had its world premiere at the BFI London Film Festival on 16 October 2021, and was also aired that same day on BBC.

References

External links
 

2021 films
British drama films
BBC Film films
Eon Productions films
Films shot in London
2021 drama films
2020s English-language films
2020s British films